A genizah (also geniza; plural: genizot[h] or genizahs) is a storage area in a Jewish synagogue or cemetery designated for the temporary storage of worn-out Hebrew-language books and papers on religious topics prior to proper cemetery burial.

Etymology
The word genizah comes from the Hebrew triconsonantal root g-n-z, which means "to hide" or "to put away", from Old Median *ganza- (“depository; treasure”). The derived noun meant 'hiding' and later a place where one put things, and is perhaps best translated as "archive" or "repository".

Description

Genizot are temporary repositories designated for the storage of worn-out Hebrew language books and papers on religious topics prior to proper cemetery burial, it being forbidden to throw away writings containing the name of God. As even personal letters and legal contracts may open with an invocation of God, the contents of genizot have not been limited to religious materials; in practice, they have also contained writings of a secular nature, with or without the customary opening invocation, as well as writings in other Jewish languages that use the Hebrew alphabet (the Judeo-Arabic languages, Judeo-Persian, Judaeo-Spanish, and Yiddish).

Genizot are typically found in the attic or basement of a synagogue,  but can also be in walls or buried underground.  They may also be located in cemeteries.

The contents of genizot are periodically gathered solemnly and then buried in the cemetery or bet ḥayyim. Synagogues in Jerusalem buried the contents of their genizot every seventh year, as well as during a year of drought, believing that this would bring rain. This custom is associated with the far older practice of burying a great or good man with a sefer (either a book of the Tanakh, or the Mishnah, the Talmud, or any work of rabbinic literature) which has become pasul (unfit for use through illegibility or old age). The tradition of paper-interment is known to have been practiced in Morocco, Algiers, Turkey, Yemen and Egypt.

History

The Talmud (Tractate Shabbat 115a) directs that holy writings in other than the Hebrew language require genizah, that is, preservation. In Tractate Pesachim 118b, bet genizah is a treasury. In Pesachim 56a, Hezekiah hides (ganaz) a medical work; in Shabbat 115a, Gamaliel orders that the targum to the Book of Job should be hidden (yigganez) under the nidbak (layer of stones). In Shabbat 30b, there is a reference to those rabbis who sought to categorize the books of Ecclesiastes and Proverbs as heretical; this occurred before the canonization of the Hebrew Bible, when disputes flared over which books should be considered Biblical. The same thing occurs in Shabbat 13b in regard to the Book of Ezekiel, and in Pesachim 62 in regard to the Book of Genealogies.

In medieval times, Hebrew scraps and papers that were relegated to the genizah were known as shemot "names," because their sanctity and consequent claim to preservation were held to depend on their containing the "names" of God. In addition to papers, articles connected with ritual, such as tzitzit, lulavim, and sprigs of myrtle, are similarly stored.

According to folklore, these scraps were used to hide the famed Golem of Prague, whose body is claimed to lie in the genizah of the Old New Synagogue in Prague.

By far, the best-known genizah, which is famous for both its size and spectacular contents, is the Cairo Geniza. Recognized for its importance and introduced to the Western world in 1864 by Jacob Saphir, and chiefly studied by Solomon Schechter, Jacob Mann and Shelomo Dov Goitein, the genizah had an accumulation of almost 280,000 Jewish manuscript fragments dating from 870 to the 19th century. These materials were important for reconstructing the religious, social and economic history of Jews, especially in the Middle Ages. For all practical purposes, the Dead Sea Scrolls, discovered between the years 1946 and 1956, belonged to a genizah from the 2nd-century BCE.

In 1927, a manuscript containing Nathan ben Abraham's 11th-century Mishnah commentary was discovered in the genizah of the Jewish community of Sana'a, Yemen. Nathan had served as President of the Academy under the revised Palestinian geonate, shortly before its demise in the early 12th century CE. In 2011, the so-called Afghan Geniza, an 11th century collection of manuscript fragments in Hebrew, Aramaic, Judaeo-Arabic and Judeo-Persian, was found in Afghanistan, in caves used by the Taliban.

References

External links

AHRC Rylands Cairo Genizah Project
Jewish Encyclopedia entry
Princeton University Geniza Project
Afghan Genizah acquisition by the National Library of Israel
Taylor-Schechter Genizah Research Unit
The Cairo Genizah Collection, Cambridge Digital Library

Jewish law and rituals
Jewish texts
Synagogues